Hymenobacter qilianensis  is a Gram-negative, rod-shaped, non-spore-forming and non-motile bacterium from the genus of Hymenobacter which has been isolated from the permafrost region of Qilian Mountains in China.

References 

qilianensis
Bacteria described in 2014